Acotango is the central and highest of a group of stratovolcanoes straddling the border of Bolivia and Chile. The group is known as Kimsa Chata and consists of three mountains: Acotango, Umurata north of it and Capurata south of it.

The group lies along a north–south alignment. The Acotango volcano is heavily eroded, but a lava flow on its northern flank is morphologically young, suggesting Acotango was active in the Holocene. Later research has suggested that lava flow may be of Pleistocene age. Argon-argon dating has yielded ages of 192,000±8,000 and 241,000±27,000 years on dacites from Acotango. Glacial activity has exposed parts of the inner volcano, which is hydrothermally altered. Glacial moraines lie at an altitude of  but a present ice cap is only found past  of altitude.

The volcano is a popular hiking route in the Sajama National Park and Lauca National Park. It is on the border of two provinces: Chilean province of Parinacota and Bolivian province of Sajama. Its slopes are within the administrative boundaries of two cities: Chilean commune of Putre and Bolivian commune of Turco.

To climb the summit from the Chilean side is dangerous due to land mines, however it is relatively safe to climb the summit from the Bolivian side. The southern ascent starts over a glacier and passes an abandoned copper mine.

First Ascent and human presence 
Acotango's first modern ascent was by Sergio Kunstmann, Pedro Rosende and Claudio Meier (Chile) October 14, 1965. It is believed that Pedro Rosende, a Chilean explorer, found the remains of firewood at the summit of Acotango. Because of this, it is thought that the mountain might have been one of the high Incan Andean sanctuaries. However, more exploration is needed to verify this information.

See also
 K'isi K'isini
 Kuntur Ikiña
 Salla Qullu
 List of volcanoes in Bolivia
 List of volcanoes in Chile
 List of stratovolcanoes

Notes

References

Volcanoes of Arica y Parinacota Region
Stratovolcanoes of Chile
Subduction volcanoes
Pleistocene stratovolcanoes
Volcanoes of Oruro Department
Mountains of Chile
Bolivia–Chile border
International mountains of South America
Six-thousanders of the Andes